Shane Austin Lemieux (born May 12, 1997) is an American football guard for the New York Giants of the National Football League (NFL). He played college football at Oregon.

High school career
Lemieux played at West Valley High School as a tight end and offensive lineman. He was ranked as the 36th best offensive tackle prospect, and received offers from over half of the Pac-12. A 3-star recruit, Lemieux committed to Oregon on May 3, 2014, choosing the Ducks over offers from Boise State, Michigan, NC State, and South Carolina, among others.

College career
While Lemieux redshirted his freshman season, he did not miss a start between 2016 and 2019, starting 52 games over those four seasons.

After his junior season, Lemieux and a group of teammates (including quarterback Justin Herbert) considered leaving for the NFL Draft, but collectively decided to stay. Lemieux had also sought out an evaluation from the NFL's College Advisory Board and was advised to return to school.

After his senior season, Lemieux was named a second-team All-American by both the Associated Press and Sporting News, and was named first-team all-Pac-12.

Professional career

New York Giants
Lemieux was selected by the New York Giants in the fifth round with the 150th overall pick in the 2020 NFL Draft.
On Monday Night Football on November 2, he started his first game at left guard for Will Hernandez who tested positive for COVID-19. Lemieux retained the starting position for the remainder of the season, replacing Hernandez at left guard, playing in 12 games with 9 starts as a rookie.

On September 16, 2021, Lemieux was placed on injured reserve after aggravating a knee injury in Week 1. On September 22, Lemieux underwent season-ending surgery to repair his left knee's patella tendon. Lemieux was the 2nd Giants offensive lineman to be announced out for the season, following Nick Gates' injury in Week 2's Thursday Night Football.

On August 11, 2022, Lemieux injured his toe in week 1 of the preseason against the New England Patriots. He was placed on injured reserve on August 31, 2022. On November 19, 2022, he was activated from injured reserve.

References

External links
New York Giants bio
Oregon Ducks bio

1997 births
Living people
Sportspeople from Yakima, Washington
Players of American football from Washington (state)
American football offensive guards
Oregon Ducks football players
New York Giants players